Leith is an unincorporated community in Washington County, in the U.S. state of Ohio.

History
A post office called Leith was established in 1891, and remained in operation until 1942. In 1902, Leith was one of five post offices in Independence Township.

References

Unincorporated communities in Washington County, Ohio
Unincorporated communities in Ohio